Barna C. Roup House is a historic home located at Perry in Wyoming County, New York. It was built in 1898, and is a -story, Queen Anne-style frame dwelling with a 1927 addition. It features intersecting gable roofs, asymmetrical massing, polygonal bays on three sides, and an elaborately detailed, wrap-around porch.  The porch is supported by Doric order columns and has a turreted roof and a small balcony above.  Also located on the property is a two-bay, wood-frame pyramidal hipped-roof garage dated to the early 19th century. The house was built by a notable local attorney during the period of village's major growth.

It was listed on the National Register of Historic Places in 2015.

References

Houses on the National Register of Historic Places in New York (state)
Houses completed in 1898
Queen Anne architecture in New York (state)
Houses in Wyoming County, New York
National Register of Historic Places in Wyoming County, New York